Westside is a New Zealand comedy drama television series created by Rachel Lang and James Griffin for South Pacific Pictures. It is a prequel to Outrageous Fortune, and chronicles the lives of Ted and Rita West. The show aired from 31 May 2015 to 16 November 2020 on Three.

Series 4 premiered on 9 July 2018. On 21 July 2018 NZ on Air announced funding for a fifth series which will consist of 10 episodes. On 19 July 2019, NZ on Air announced funding for a sixth and final series of Westside.

Plot 
The first series is set in the 1970s, it features a Westie couple, and stars Antonia Prebble and David de Lautour as Rita and Ted West. In the first episode, set in 1974, it features John Walker beating Rod Dixon in the 1500 metres at the 1974 Commonwealth Games. Each episode covers one year, from 1974 to 1979, with events like the Muldoon election, dawn raids on overstayers, carless days, and the birth of the punk rock scene in Auckland.

The second series is set in 1981, and follows the Springbok Tour. The series starts with Rita returning home from prison to find the West household in disrepair. Throughout the course of the series Ted's gang plots to steal from the South Africans visiting New Zealand, preventing them from buying land, while Rita plans a job against developer Evan Lace.

The third series is set in 1982 and deals with the fallout from the Evan Lace job and Wolf's first meeting with his future wife, Cheryl.

Cast and characters 
This table shows the show's characters and the cast members who have portrayed them.

Note: Only those appearing in more than one episode appear in this list, and only when the actor contributes new material to an episode.

Color key:

Main cast 
 Antonia Prebble as Rita West, wife of Ted and mother to Wolf. Prebble had previously starred as Rita's granddaughter Loretta West in Outrageous Fortune
 David de Lautour as Theodore "Ted" West, husband of Rita and father to Wolf
 Dan Musgrove as Russell "Lefty" Munroe, husband of Ngaire and father to Desiree, Chelsea and Lisa
 Esther Stephens as Ngaire Munroe, wife of Lefty and mother to Desiree, Chelsea and Lisa
 Todd Emerson as Bjelke "Bilkey" van Heeder
 Pana Hema-Taylor as Bert Thompson
 Xavier Horan as Phineas O'Driscoll, husband of Carol 
 Sophie Hambleton as Carol O'Driscoll, wife of Phineas
 Reef Ireland as Wolfgang "Wolf" West , Ted and Rita West's son
 Ashleigh Cummings as Cheryl Miller , Wolf's girlfriend/wife
 Jessica Grace Smith as Cheryl West , Wolf's wife

Recurring cast 
 Will Hall as Mike McArthy; police detective
 Jordan Mauger as Rod Nugent; shady pawn shop owner, Rita blackmails him into signing the Galleria over to her
 Glen Levy as Darijo Doslic; neighbour/associate of the Wests
 Patrick Tafa as Falani; friend of Wolf
 Joel Tobeck as Des McEwen; shady lawyer
 Caleb Wells as Barry "Sparky" Gibbs; friend of Wolf, brother to Annemarie, son of Dougal
 Jordan Mooney as Eric Grady; friend of Wolf
 Dean O'Gorman as Evan Lace; local businessman		
 Hannah Marshall as Joanne; Evan's girlfriend		
 Laura Hill as Belinda Lace; Evan's wife, was in prison with Rita	
 Tim Carlsen as Terry; local constable
 Stelios Yiakmis as Dave; protest group leader	
 Kirsten Ibbetson as Riana Adams; student, later cop, dated Bert
 Salomé Grace as Chelsea Munroe; Ngaire & Lefty's middle daughter
 Ella Shirtcliffe as Lisa Munroe; Ngaire & Lefty's youngest daughter
 Jodie Dorday as Trish Miller; Cheryl's mother
 Jessie Lawrence as Jeanette Miller; Cheryl's older sister
 Lily Powell as Mandy Miller; Cheryl's younger sister
 Shane Cortese as Danny Peters; local brothel owner/pimp			
 Pierre Beasley as Hayden Peters; Danny's son
 Elizabeth Dowden as Theresa Deering; one of Danny's workers; has a relationship with Lefty

Guest cast 
 Matthew Arbuckle as Shane, local constable, has a crush on Cheryl
 Jarred Blakiston as Vern Gardiner, neighbour of the Wests at their old house, has an affair with Rita, while Ted is in prison
 Ross Brannigan as Father Murphy, Phineas' parish priest
 Alistair Browning as Dieter Szabo, Rita's Nazi father
 Rachale Davies as Jackie, Cheryl's maternal aunt, Trish's sister 
 Geoffrey Dolan as Neville, a country farmer, on who Lefty sets up a burglary 
 Wesley Dowdell as Dick Spiller, father to Aaron (played Aaron in Outrageous Fortune)
 Peter Elliott as Frankie Figgs, shady businessman and nemesis of the Wests
 David Fane as Ofisa Falani (Senior)
 Eve Gordon as Pat, an old friend of Rita's 
 Andrew Grainger as Declan Corke, likely grandfather to Franklin (Outrageous Fortune)
 Taylor Hall as Allen Markham, car dealer
 Jason Hodzelmans as Brian, neighbour of the Wests, Wendy's husband
 Jamie Irvine as Marty Johnstone
 Michelle Langstone as Bianca, daughter of Frankie Figgs and older sister of Krystle
 John Leigh as Dougal Gibbs, an associate of Ted, father to Sparky and Annemarie 
 Gabriel McArtney as Captain Hook (Dave McArtney), vocalist/guitarist of Hello Sailor
 Jaime McDermott as Annemarie Gibbs, Sparky's sister and daughter to Dougal 
 Laura McGoldrick as Wendy, neighbour of the Wests
 Dra McKay as Elsa Szabo, Rita's mother (Season 4–6)
 Toni Potter as Mary Peters, wife to Danny, mother to Hayden (Season 4)
 Alison Quigan as Old Lady
 John Rawls as Gang Leader, of "The Horsemen" gang Wolf is coerced into joining (Season 2) 
 Ilona Rodgers as Grandma Miller, Cheryl's paternal grandmother (Season 4)
 Renee Sheridan as Maureen, Cheryl's maternal aunt, Trish's sister (Season 4)
 Rima Te Wiata as Iris, Ted's bookie (Season 4–6)
 Roz Turnbull as Sonia Stephens, Rochelle's mum (played Rochelle Stephens in Outrageous Fortune) (Season 5)
 Nicole Whippy as Kasey's mum (played Kasey in Outrageous Fortune) (Season 4)
 Scott Wills as Buck, gang member of "The Horsemen" (Season 2)

Production 
In July 2014, NZ on Air approved funding of NZ$4.8 million for the miniseries. On 28 July 2015, NZ on Air approved funding of NZ$7.6 million for a second series, on 2 August 2016 NZ$6.6 million was approved for a third series and on 24 July 2017 NZ$6.5 million was approved for a fourth series. In September an additional NZ$1.2 million was approved for series four.

Filming 
Filming for series one commenced on 12 October and concluded on 17 December 2014. Filming for series two commenced on 27 September 2015 and concluded on 19 January 2016. Filming for series three commenced on 30 October 2016 and concluded on 3 February 2017. Filming for series four commenced on 19 November 2017 and concluded on 18 March 2018.

Music 

Westside: The Original Soundtrack was released for digital download on 8 July 2015 and CD on 10 July 2015. It peaked at number nineteen in New Zealand. Music from Westside Series Two was released for digital download on 1 July 2016

Charts 
Series 1

Release

Broadcast 
Series 2 premiered in New Zealand on 12 June 2016 and series 3 premiered on 10 July 2017.

Series 1 premiered in Australia on 9Gem on 2 December 2015, and series 2 premiered on 8 August 2016.

Home media 
Series 1 is available on the iTunes Store in Australia.

Series overview

Episodes

Series 1 (2015)

Series 2 (2016)

Series 3 (2017)

Series 4 (2018)

Series 5 (2019)

Series 6 (2020)

Awards and nominations

C21's International Drama Awards

New York Festivals International Film & TV Awards

New Zealand Television Awards

New Zealand Television Craft Awards

References 

General references

External links 
 
 
  at South Pacific Pictures
 
  at NZ on Air

2010s New Zealand television series
2020s New Zealand television series
2015 New Zealand television series debuts
2020 New Zealand television series endings
English-language television shows
New Zealand comedy-drama television series
Prequel television series
Television productions suspended due to the COVID-19 pandemic
Television shows filmed in New Zealand
Television shows funded by NZ on Air
Television series by All3Media
Television series by South Pacific Pictures
Television series set in the 1970s
Television series set in the 1980s
Television series set in the 1990s
Television shows set in Auckland
Three (TV channel) original programming